Omega is a video game developed and published by Origin Systems in 1989. It was directed by Stuart B. Marks.

Gameplay
The game puts the player in the role of a cyber-tank designer and programmer. Given a limited budget, the player must design a tank that can defeat a series of ever more challenging opponent tanks. Each successful design yields a higher security clearance and a larger budget, ultimately resulting in an OMEGA clearance and an unlimited budget. The focus of the game is not on the combat but on game programming the tank itself.

Tanks are programmed using a built-in text editor that allows the player to use various artificial intelligence script commands, similar in structure to BASIC. These commands permit control of various aspects of the tank, and also allows teams of tanks to communicate and coordinate actions. While commands exist that enable a range of control over the tank, successful designs tend to be automated. Decision making is an important part of the design process, as the programming must reflect the equipment placed on the tank.

Code was cross-platform, so Apple, Commodore, and IBM users could compete against each other. Origin operated a bulletin board system for Omega owners.

Reception

Compute! praised Omega, stating that it made writing code for tanks easy and fun for those new to programming.
Russell Sipe of Computer Gaming World in 1989 gave the game a positive review, noting its similarities and improvements over RobotWar. In a 1992 survey of science fiction games the magazine gave the title two of five stars, stating that "Programmer love this 'simulation' [but] it's all geek to me".

John Inglis reviewed Omega for Games International magazine, and gave it 4 stars out of 5, and stated that "In summary I would say that Omega is a unique game that has had a considerable amount of thought lavished on it. It is not a game for the shoot-em-up enthusiast, as you must put considerable though in before you get anywhere."

References

External links

Omega Game Documentation

1989 video games
Amiga games
Apple II games
Apple IIGS games
Atari ST games
Commodore 64 games
DOS games
Classic Mac OS games
NEC PC-9801 games
Programming games
Video games developed in the United States